Elfje Willemsen (born 11 January 1985 in Turnhout) is a Belgian bobsledder who has competed since 2007.

Bobsledding career
Willemsen finished 18th in the two-woman event at the FIBT World Championships 2009 in Lake Placid, New York.

She qualified with the national bobsleigh team for the 2010 Winter Olympics. Together with Eva Willemarck she reached 14th place in the Two-woman bob competition.

In 2014, she participated at the 2014 Winter Olympics, where she and Hanna Mariën ended sixth in the two woman bob.

Other athletics
Before her career as bobsledder, Willemsen competed as a javelin thrower.

References

External links
 
 

1985 births
Living people
Belgian female javelin throwers
Belgian female bobsledders
Bobsledders at the 2010 Winter Olympics
Bobsledders at the 2014 Winter Olympics
Bobsledders at the 2018 Winter Olympics
Olympic bobsledders of Belgium
Sportspeople from Turnhout